The International Design Business Management program (IDBM) is a joint teaching and research programme in Aalto University, Finland. The purpose of the program is to bring together experts in different fields within the concept of design business management.

The objective of the IDBM program is to train skilled professionals for key roles in international design business. The program emphasizes the importance of design as a competitive factor among others, such as technology. Arising from the needs of the industry, this program gives future marketers, engineering experts and designers an opportunity to practice important interpersonal skills through projects and courses. The program teaches students to make full use of their own potential as members of interdisciplinary teams.

IDBM as a major 
The IDBM Master program is a two-year 120 ECTS degree program that contains four core modules, elective studies, and a master's thesis. The program can be taken completely in English.

A maximum of 36 students is selected yearly to start the IDBM Master's Program in Aalto University. The IDBM Master's Program is jointly organized by the three Aalto University schools: the School of Art, Design and Architecture, the School of Business, and the School of Science; and rewards one of the following degrees:
Master of Arts, Master of Science (Economics and Business Administration), Master of Science (Technology).

Students who have completed a bachelor's degree at a university are welcome to apply for admission to pursue a master's degree in IDBM. The previous degree must be in the same or relevant field with the master's degree applied for. The application for the IDBM Master's Program is submitted through one of the three organizing schools of Aalto University: the School of Art, Design and Architecture, the School of Business or the School of Science. For each school maximum of 12 students are chosen. More information about eligibility criteria can be found on the admission website of Aalto University. It is possible to apply for the IDBM program through more than one Aalto University school, if the applicants fulfill the field-specific eligibility criteria. In such a case an applicant should deliver the appropriate application package for each school. Such an applicant, however, can be selected only through one of the Aalto University schools. An accepted student completes the master's degree of the school which they are accepted to.

IDBM as a minor 
The IDBM is also offered as a minor study entity. The IDBM minor program is 24-40 ECTS credit study entity for master level students. The program is a joint offering of the Aalto University School of Business, the School of Arts, Design and Architecture and the School of Science. The program emphasizes the importance of design as a competitive factor, linked with state-of-the-art technology and business models.

The IDBM minor program is mainly meant for the students of Aalto University but students from other Finnish universities are also warmly welcomed. Prerequisites for being accepted to the program are 150 cr studies, an interest in multidisciplinary teamwork and the possibility to follow through a very intense program.

IDBM research areas 
In addition to mastering the graduate-level program and practice-based industry projects, IDBM has carried out its own research and participated in the development of the international community in design management research. Since the beginning of the Program, different research activities have emerged, including numerous master theses, few doctoral theses, and special reports conducted within the IDBM sphere, let alone the research components of the industry projects.

The more extensive and systematic development of IDBM research activities started in 2007 as part of the wider evolution towards the new version of IDBM within the incipient Aalto University. Since that IDBM has been able to substantially increase its research activities, as a number of new externally funded projects have been initiated and conducted. The collection of recent IDBM publications consists of around 60 articles in journals, conferences, books, and other media.

In line with the generic goals of the Program, IDBM research has the aim to generate systemic and multidisciplinary knowledge applicable to global business development that is design- and technology-intensive. IDBM functions at the intersection of disciplines, integrating relevant parts of existing disciplinary views and epistemologies, and developing new theoretical and empirical perspectives on the multidisciplinary interaction. IDBM research is strongly based on empirical data and industry interaction. It nurtures an explorative, creative, and open-minded approach in order to be agile and reactive towards emerging phenomena within design and creative industries.

Industry Projects 
The students in the IDBM programme offer their knowledge in the form of industry projects. Since 2010, some 10-12 projects have been completed per annum within the IDBM program; many for leading Finnish or international companies. Each project is completed by teams of 3 to 5 students representing the School of Art, Design and Architecture, the School of Business and the School of Science. An expert is chosen to supervise the progress of the project. The projects are confidential; if necessary, the students and the supervisors will sign a non-disclosure agreement.

The project topics have dealt with new product concepts (design and user interface issues), the definition of customer needs and the future environment of a product, the analysis of markets and customer feedback, and the examination of corporate identity, communications and design management, among other things. Usually the duration of the industry project is one academic year (from September to May). A project can also be completed within a tighter schedule if necessary.

In the industry projects, the company involved is able to come into contact with young, innovative students and to obtain first-hand information on the most recent research and training in the field. During the course of the project, the company also has an opportunity to evaluate the students in view of possible future collaboration.

See also 
 Aalto University
 List of universities in Finland
 Finnish education system
 Design management

External links 
 IDBM website
 Emerging design programs

Educational institutions established in 1871
Art schools in Finland
Design schools
Art and Design Helsinki
Education in Helsinki
Culture in Helsinki
1871 establishments in Finland